The 2019 season was the New Orleans Saints' 53rd in the National Football League (NFL), their 44th playing home games at the Mercedes-Benz Superdome and their 13th under head coach Sean Payton.

The Saints matched their 13–3 record from the year prior, which ended with the team losing in the NFC Championship to the Los Angeles Rams due to a controversial pass interference no-call on the Rams defense. They attempted to make it to the Super Bowl for the first time since Super Bowl XLIV. Despite losing Drew Brees to a thumb injury for Weeks 3 to 7, the Saints went 5–0 in his absence under backup Teddy Bridgewater and won the NFC South for the third consecutive season after beating their division rival Atlanta Falcons on Thanksgiving night. The Saints matched their record from the previous year after defeating their divisional rivals Carolina Panthers in week 17, sweeping them for the second time in three seasons, but were not able to secure a first round bye due to a three way tiebreaker with the San Francisco 49ers and Green Bay Packers. This was the first time in franchise history the Saints posted back-to-back seasons with 12 or more wins. They hosted the Minnesota Vikings in the wild card round, the fifth meeting between the two teams in the playoffs. However, for the third time in three straight years, the Saints were eliminated in the playoffs, losing 26–20 to the Vikings in overtime.

Off-season

Resigned

New signings

Departures

NFL draft

Notes
 The Saints traded their 2018 first- and fifth-round selections (27th and 147th overall), and their 2019 first-round selection (30th overall) to the Green Bay Packers in exchange for the Packers' 2018 first-round selection (14th overall).
 The Saints traded their 2019 third-round selection (93rd overall) to the New York Jets in exchange for the Jets' 2019 sixth-round selection (177th overall) and quarterback Teddy Bridgewater.
 The Saints traded their 2019 fourth-round selection (132nd overall) and a 2020 seventh-round selection (238th overall) to the New York Giants in exchange for cornerback Eli Apple.
 The Saints received a 2019 seventh-round selection (231st overall) from the Cleveland Browns in exchange for defensive tackle Devaroe Lawrence.

Staff

Final roster

Preseason

Regular season

Schedule

Note: Intra-division opponents are in bold text.

Game summaries

Week 1: vs. Houston Texans

The game was an offensive shootout. The Saints started slow and fell behind 14–3 at halftime. The Saints offense took off in the third quarter and they outscored the Texans 24–7 in the next 29 minutes of the game. With less than one minute to play, Texans quarterback Deshaun Watson threw a go-ahead touchdown to wide receiver Kenny Stills; however, the Saints and Brees were able to move the ball down the field and kicker Wil Lutz kicked a 58–yard field goal to lead the team to victory. This was the first time the Saints won their season opener since the 2013 season.

Week 2: at Los Angeles Rams

In a rematch of 2018's controversial NFC Championship game, Drew Brees collided with Aaron Donald while attempting to pass; the hit broke Brees' thumb, forcing him out of action for the next five weeks following surgery. In place of the injured Brees, Teddy Bridgewater was held to just 165 yards passing. On defense, Cam Jordan strip sacked Jared Goff and returned a fumble 87 yards for a touchdown, which was controversially overturned.

The loss dropped the Saints to 1–1. After the game, head coach Sean Payton agreed to a five-year contract extension. The Saints don't match up with the Rams until the 2022 season.

Week 3: at Seattle Seahawks

In a surprising upset on the road against Seattle without starting quarterback Drew Brees, the Saints led 27–7 going into the fourth quarter thanks to two touchdown passes from quarterback Teddy Bridgewater, in addition to touchdowns off a punt return and a fumble recovery. The Seahawks scored 20 points in the final period, but a short touchdown run from Alvin Kamara proved the difference between the two teams, to move the Saints to 2–1 on the season.

Week 4: vs. Dallas Cowboys

The Saints found yet another way to win a game without star quarterback Drew Brees and with Teddy Bridgewater at the helm, as Wil Lutz kicked four field goals. It was the first Saints win since week 8 of the 1998 season to feature no touchdowns. The Saints would improve their overall record to 3-1.

Week 5: vs. Tampa Bay Buccaneers

Bridgewater improved to 3–0 as a starter with a strong performance throwing for 314 yards and four touchdowns. The Saints defense sacked Buccaneers quarterback Jameis Winston six times in the win. Buccaneers' cornerback Carlton Davis committed a helmet-to-helmet hit on tight end Jared Cook, resulting in Davis being ejected from the game. After the Saints secured their win against Tampa Bay, they improve their overall record to 4-1.

Week 6: at Jacksonville Jaguars

In a defensive game, both offenses struggled to score as the game was tied 3–3 at halftime and 6–6 at the end of the third quarter. A touchdown pass from Bridgewater to Jared Cook proved to be the difference.

With the win, the Saints improved to 5–1 and Bridgewater improved to 4–0 as a starter. Cook and running back Alvin Kamara suffered injuries during the game.

Week 7: at Chicago Bears

The Saints dominated the Bears with a strong performance on both sides of the football. Bridgewater threw for 281 yards and 3 touchdowns. Running back Latavius Murray, filling in for an injured Alvin Kamara, rushed for over 100 yards on the ground. The Saints stifled the Bears offense for the majority of the game before giving up two touchdowns in garbage time. The win improved the Saints to 6–1 and Bridgewater to 5–0, setting the stage for Drew Brees's comeback.

Week 8: vs. Arizona Cardinals

With Alvin Kamara still sidelined, Drew Brees returned after missing five weeks following thumb surgery. He threw for 373 yards and 3 touchdowns as the Saints dominated the Cardinals to improve to 7–1.

Week 10: vs. Atlanta Falcons

In a shocking fashion, the Saints were defeated by the 1–7 Falcons. Drew Brees had a miserable day, being sacked six times by an inspired Falcons pass-rush; the Falcons had recorded just seven prior to this game.

The loss dropped them to 7–2. The Saints were flagged 10 times for 120 yards in the loss.

Week 11: at Tampa Bay Buccaneers

Brees and the Saints bounced back from the previous week. He threw three touchdowns and 228 yards in the game. The Saints defense intercepted Buccaneers QB Jameis Winston four times, including a pick-six by safety Marcus Williams to ice the game in the fourth quarter. The win improved the Saints to 8–2, and they swept the Buccaneers for the first time since 2014.

Week 12: vs. Carolina Panthers

The game was close all the way. Both Brees and Panthers quarterback Kyle Allen played well, with three touchdown passes each. After benefiting from a pass interference penalty, the Panthers were set up with a 1st-and-goal at the Saints' 5-yard line, but the Saints defense held strong, and kicker Joey Slye missed a short field goal. Brees quickly moved the Saints down the field and Wil Lutz made the game-winning field goal from 36 yards out.

With the win, the Saints improved to 9–2, ensuring a winning record for the third straight season.

Week 13: at Atlanta Falcons
Thanksgiving Day Games

The Saints played an excellent game and got revenge on their division rivals. The Saints defense played one of its best games of the season with 9 sacks of Matt Ryan and forced 3 takeaways. Taysom Hill blocked a punt early, caught a touchdown pass and ran one in from 30 yards out.

With the win, the Saints clinched the NFC South title for the third straight season. The Saints improved their record to 10-2.

Week 14: vs. San Francisco 49ers

In the NFL's second-highest-scoring game of 2019, Brees and 49ers quarterback Jimmy Garoppolo threw for a combined 698 yards and nine touchdowns as the two teams traded blows all game long. Brees played his best game of the season with his five touchdowns against one of the league's best pass defenses. Although Brees found Tre'Quan Smith late in the game to take a 46–45 lead, Garoppolo connected with tight end George Kittle who ran past several Saints defenders on one of the iconic plays of the season. This set up Robbie Gould's game winning 30-yard field goal as time expired.

With the loss, the Saints fell to 10–3.

Week 15: vs. Indianapolis Colts

Drew Brees threw four touchdown passes, passing Peyton Manning for most career touchdown passes. His completion percentage of 96.67% set a new record for single-game completion percentage (by a quarterback who attempted more than 10 passes in the game) as the Saints demolished the Colts 34–7, improving to 11–3.

Week 16: at Tennessee Titans

The Saints started the game poorly, falling into an early 14–0 deficit. However, from there they scored 24 unanswered points to take the lead. With the Titans driving and only down 3, Kalif Raymond was tackled by C. J. Gardner-Johnson and lost a fumble; the hit was controversially not flagged.

The Saints improved to 12–3. Michael Thomas broke Marvin Harrison's 18-year record for most receptions in a single season with 145. Alvin Kamara rushed for two touchdowns, his first since Week 3 and bringing his season total to four. The Saints were the only NFC South team to defeat all four of their AFC South opponents in 2019.

Week 17: at Carolina Panthers

The Saints dominated the Panthers to end their regular season. Kamara rushed for two more touchdowns and Brees threw three against a bad Panthers defense. Linebacker A. J. Klein intercepted an errant pass by Panthers quarterback Will Grier and returned it for a 14-yard pick-six.

The win improved the Saints to 13–3. However, they were unable to clinch a first-round bye as the Green Bay Packers and San Francisco 49ers also won.

Standings

Division

Conference

Postseason

Schedule

Game summaries

NFC Wild Card Playoffs: vs. (6) Minnesota Vikings

With this loss, the Saints suffered their first one-and-done postseason campaign since 2010, their sixth straight playoff loss by one score, their second straight overtime playoff loss and became the first-ever 13–3 team to lose in the Wild Card round.

References

External links
 

New Orleans
New Orleans Saints seasons
New Orleans Saints
NFC South championship seasons